The End of Meaning is the sixth full-length album by industrial/hip hop artists Consolidated, which was released in 2000.

Track listing
 "Momentary Illusion of Autonomy"  – 0:36
 "I Don't Live Today"  – 4:52
 "Tragedat at Neah Bay"  – 5:52
 "Procession for the Endless (Reprocessing)"  – 2:32
 "Just for the Sake of Fashion"  – 3:36
 "You Go Dude"  – 3:11
 "What Does It Mean?"  – 0:51
 "Freedom Now, Sweet!"  – 3:43
 "Get in Touch With Your Inner Loser"  – 2:41
 "Men Will Never Legislate a Pregnant Woman's Experience"  – 2:56
 "Fall Out of Culture Industry"  – 5:34
 "How Many Woodstock Brokers and Broke Stalkers Would"  – 2:36
 "Guns and Boys Who Kill"  – 2:42
 "This Dance Together Is Love of So Many Lifetimes"  – 0:51
 "Controlled from Outer Space"  – 3:04
 "Speech and Harm"  – 5:55
 "When Asked About Being Turned Out at 12, She Said, '..."  – 3:10
 "Race of Questions"  – 0:58
 "The Technological Rationale Is the Rationale of Domination Itself"  – 4:15
 "Shame, Shame, Shame"  – 2:38
 "You Make Me Feel"  – 3:16
 "My Conversation With Kevin"  – 0:51
 "I Remember You from Tennis Camp"  – 3:44
 "It's All About Money of Course"  – 1:39

2000 albums
Consolidated (band) albums